Holiday Inn & Suites Makati is a hotel in Makati, Metro Manila, Philippines. It opened on April 1, 2013, as part of the New Glorietta Phase 1 redevelopment. The hotel is built on top of a redeveloped Glorietta shopping mall in Ayala Center. The hotel is managed by InterContinental Hotels Group.

Holiday Inn & Suites Makati is InterContinental Hotels Group’s second partnership with Ayala Land before InterContinental Manila. ceased to operate in 2015.

Ayala Land reopened Glorietta 1 on November 5, 2012, while Glorietta 2 was reopened on December 7, 2012.

The hotel has 6 room types: Deluxe, Premier, Executive Club, Corner Suite, Executive Suite, and the Makati Suite. In 2016, the hotel converted its smoking floor into non-smoking which makes all its guest rooms 100% smoke-free.

References

Makati
Hotels in Metro Manila
Buildings and structures in Makati
Hotel buildings completed in 2013